Clemens Brummer (born 19 April 1986) is a German former figure skater. He is the 2008 German national champion and placed 14th at the 2008 European Championships.

Programs

Results

References

External links 

 
 Official site
 Tracings.net profile

German male single skaters
1986 births
Living people
Figure skaters from Berlin
Figure skaters at the 2007 Winter Universiade
Competitors at the 2009 Winter Universiade